The men's team table tennis event at the 2018 Asian Games took place from 26 to 28 August 2018 at the Jakarta International Expo. Team ranking was based on the ITTF world team ranking of August 2018.

Schedule
All times are Western Indonesia Time (UTC+07:00)

Results

Preliminary round

Group A

Group B

Group C

Group D

Knockout round

Quarterfinals

Semifinals

Final

Non-participating athletes

References

External links
Table tennis at the 2018 Asian Games

Men's team